John Lampe could refer to: 

John Frederick Lampe (1703-1751), German-English composer
John R. Lampe, American history professor